Erhan Erentürk (born 30 May 1995) is a Turkish professional footballer who plays as a goalkeeper for Konyaspor.

Professional career
Erentürk is a product of the youth academies of Altay, İzmir BB, Buca Geliştirmespor, and Karşıyaka. He began his senior career with Karşıyaka in 2014 in the TFF First League. He moved to Altınordu in the summer of 2018, where he was the starter for 3 seasons. For the 2021-22 season, he played with Bursaspor where he made 30 appearances in all competitions.

On 22 June 2022, he transferred to the Süper Lig club Konyaspor, signing a 3-year contract. He made his Süper Lig debut with Konyaspor in a 1–0 win over Ümraniyespor on 2 October 2022, keeping a clean sheet.

International career
Erentürk was called up to the Turkey U23s for the 2017 Islamic Solidarity Games.

References

External links
 
 

1995 births
Living people
People from Konak
Turkish footballers
Karşıyaka S.K. footballers
Altınordu F.K. players
Bursaspor footballers
Konyaspor footballers
Süper Lig players
TFF First League players
TFF Second League players
Association football goalkeepers